This article lists successive British governments, also referred to as ministries, from the creation of the Kingdom of Great Britain in 1707, continuing through the duration of the United Kingdom of Great Britain and Ireland from 1801 to 1922, and since then dealing with those of the present-day United Kingdom of Great Britain and Northern Ireland.

Guide to the list 

"Ministry" refers collectively to all the ministers of a government, including cabinet members and junior ministers alike. Only the Civil Service is considered outside of the ministry. While the term was in common parlance in the 19th and early 20th centuries, it has become rarer, except in official and academic uses. Both Australia and Canada have inherited the term and continue to use it. It is perhaps in more common use in those countries, which both have official catalogues of their respective ministries, whereas Britain has no such catalogue.

Articles listed by ministry contain information on the term(s) of one prime minister. Articles listed by political party contain information on the ministries of multiple consecutive prime ministers of the same political party. Prior to the 20th century, the leader of the British government held the title of First Lord of the Treasury, and not that of Prime Minister of the United Kingdom. Therefore, the list below refers to the "Head of Government" and not the "Prime Minister". Even so, the leader of a government was often colloquially referred to as the "prime minister", beginning in the 18th century. Since 1902, prime ministers  have always held the office of First Lord of the Treasury.

Ministries

See also 

 List of English ministries, for ministries of the Kingdom of England
 List of Scottish Governments, for ministries of the modern Scottish Government
 List of Northern Ireland Executives, for ministries of the Northern Ireland Executive
 List of Welsh Governments, for ministries of the modern Welsh Government
 List of British shadow cabinets, for a list of shadow cabinets
 List of votes of no confidence in British governments

Notes

Citations

References

Further reading 

 
 
 
 
 
 
 
 

United Kingdom politics-related lists
Parliament of Great Britain–related lists
British